Hypsocormus (from  , 'height' and   'timber log') is an extinct genus of pachycormid fish from the Middle to Late Jurassic of Europe. Fossils have been found in Germany, France and the UK.
 
The type species, H. insignis,  was originally described by Johann Andreas Wagner in 1860 from the Upper Jurassic plattenkalk limestones of Bavaria, Germany, and placed into the new genus Hypsocormus by Wagner in a posthumous publication in 1863. A second valid species, Hypsocormus posterodorsalis was named by Maxwell and colleagues in 2020 from the same deposits. The species "Hypsocormus macrodon" Wagner 1863 from the Upper Jurassic of Germany has been moved to a separate genus and renamed Simocormus macrolepidotus. The species "Hypsocormus" tenuirostris from the Middle Jurassic of England is more similar to Orthocormus, and thus has often been referred to as Orthocormus? tenuirostris.

It had a single dorsal fin, elongated pectoral fins and tiny pelvic fins about halfway down the body. An early teleost, Hypsocormus was still primitive, possessing primitive traits such as armored scales. These were, however, small compared with those of earlier fish, allowing greater flexibility. Its jaws were muscular and highly developed, giving it a powerful bite.

References

External links

Pachycormiformes
Prehistoric ray-finned fish genera
Jurassic bony fish
Jurassic fish of Europe
Middle Jurassic genus first appearances
Late Jurassic extinctions